The Brauer Museum of Art is home to a collection of 19th- and 20th-century American art, world religious art, and Midwestern regional art. It is located in the Valparaiso University Center for the Arts (VUCA) on the campus of Valparaiso University in Valparaiso, Indiana, US. Prior to the museum's opening, the university's collection was housed and displayed within several buildings across campus. It was named the Brauer Museum of Art in 1996 to honor the collection's long-time director and curator, Richard H. W. Brauer.

Collection 

The collection of the museum includes landscape paintings by Frederic Edwin Church, Asher B. Durand, John F. Kensett and largest known collection of works by painter Junius R. Sloan. Large late 19th-century paintings by T. Alexander Harrison and Elizabeth Nourse; Impressionist paintings by Karl Anderson, Childe Hassam and Robert Reid, and urban realist paintings by William Glackens and John Sloan also comprise some of the Brauer Museum's permanent collection of over 2,700 pieces.

The Brauer Museum of Art holds 150 photographs and seven silkscreen prints by Andy Warhol, including an iconic soup can painting.

The museum also holds early modernist paintings by John Marin, Walt Kuhn and Georgia O'Keeffe. Other contemporary works include artists such as Elaine de Kooning, Ed Paschke, Chuck Close, Diego Lasansky, Dale Chihuly, Frank Dudley John Himmelfarb, and Ansel Adams.

In February 2023, The Brauer came under fire for plans to sell three major works from its collection by Frederic Edwin Church, Childe Hassam, and Georgia O'Keeffe to fund improvements to a Valparaiso University dormitory.

The Brauer Museum frequently hosts special exhibitions and events. In the past, such events have featured the works of such artists as Ansel Adams and Salvador Dalí.

References

External links

Art museums established in 1996
Valparaiso University
University museums in Indiana
Art museums and galleries in Indiana
Museums in Porter County, Indiana
1996 establishments in Indiana
Buildings and structures in Valparaiso, Indiana